Donald Themba "Ace" Khuse (born 8 September 1963 in Johannesburg) is a retired South African association football player. Married to Innocentia Mampateng Motsumi, has a son Thabiso Khuse and daughter Nonhlahla Khuse.

References

External links 
 Turkish Football Federation profile

1968 births
Antalyaspor footballers
Expatriate footballers in Turkey
Gençlerbirliği S.K. footballers
Kaizer Chiefs F.C. managers
Kaizer Chiefs F.C. players
Living people
Mamelodi Sundowns F.C. players
Orlando Pirates F.C. players
South African expatriate soccer players
South Africa international soccer players
South African soccer players
Süper Lig players
Association football midfielders
South African soccer managers